Presidential elections were held in the Republic of Serbia on December 8, 2002. They followed elections in September and October which were invalidated due to voter turnout not meeting the 50% requirement. Although the legal requirement of a turnout of at least 50% of registered voters was dropped for the second round of this election, turnout in the first round was below 50%, invalidating the election before a second round.

Results

References

2002 12
Serbia
2002 12
Serbia
Presidential 2